Zacorisca holantha is a species of moth of the family Tortricidae. It is found on New Guinea.

The wingspan is about 28 mm. The forewings are deep iridescent blue with a rather narrow deep coppery-red terminal fascia. The hindwings are blackish suffused with deep blue.

References

	

Moths described in 1910
Zacorisca